The 1984 United States presidential election in Utah took place on November 6, 1984. All 50 states and the District of Columbia, were part of the 1984 United States presidential election. State voters chose five electors to the Electoral College, which selected the president and vice president of the United States. Utah was won by incumbent United States President Ronald Reagan of California, who was running against former Vice President Walter Mondale of Minnesota. Reagan ran for a second time with incumbent Vice President and former C.I.A. Director George H. W. Bush of Texas, and Mondale ran with Representative Geraldine Ferraro of New York, the first major female candidate for the vice presidency.

The presidential election of 1984 was a very partisan election for Utah, with just under 99% of the electorate voting for either the Democratic or Republican parties, though several other parties appeared on the ballot. Reagan posted the highest vote share of any nominee in the state since William Jennings Bryan in 1896, and carried every county in the state. Reagan's best county was Box Elder County, although he broke 80% in 15 counties. Mondale's best county was Carbon County, the only one in which he managed to hold Reagan to a plurality, rather than a majority, win. Mondale did make gains vis-à-vis Jimmy Carter of over ten percent in eastern Daggett County and San Juan County, probably related to a general trend in this election of Native American voters towards Mondale. The highly populated Salt Lake County contributed about half of the Democratic votes produced by Utah, but still was won decisively by Reagan by 40 points, in what was, overall, a very solid statewide victory.

Reagan won a resounding 50-point landslide victory in Utah, his strongest victory in the nation both by vote share and by margin. For the third election in a row, Utah gave the Republican nominee his highest vote share in the nation, a trend that began in 1976 and would continue unbroken through 1988, and intermittently through 2012. Reagan's strength in Utah was part of a broader phenomenon of the growing importance of the Mountain West as a Republican base; this region had been a swing region for the sixty years following James Weaver's Populist run in 1892, solidly backing William Jennings Bryan in his narrow 1896 defeat as well as Woodrow Wilson and Harry Truman in their narrow 1916 and 1948 wins, respectively. The Mountain West began trending Republican in close elections in 1960, however, when Nixon carried all but two states in the region (New Mexico and Nevada). Jimmy Carter's presidency accelerated the trend, with his administration's policies on water and energy being widely perceived as a 'war on the West.' In 1980, Carter underperformed even his low national percentage throughout the West. Reagan's popularity in the West increased in 1984; no Republican nominee has received such strong support in the Mountain West as Reagan did.

Reagan also enjoyed high levels of bipartisan support during the 1984 presidential election, both in Utah, and across the nation at large. Many registered Democrats who voted for Reagan (Reagan Democrats) stated that they had chosen to do so because they associated him with the economic recovery, because of his strong stance on national security issues with Russia, and because they considered the Democrats as "supporting American poor and minorities at the expense of the middle class."  These public opinion factors contributed to Reagan's 1984 landslide victory, in Utah and elsewhere. No subsequent Republican nominee has matched Reagan's 74% win.

At 74.50%, Reagan won Utah with the highest percentage of the vote in any state from the presidential elections since 1984, although fellow Republican Mitt Romney did come close to surpassing that margin when he won this state with 72.62% in 2012. Despite his high margin, at a victory margin of 49.82%, he won the state by a slightly reduced margin than in 1980, when he won Utah by 52.2%. Mondale improved on Jimmy Carter's 1980 margins by over 10% in Daggett County and San Juan County, as well as improving slightly in Morgan County. Reagan improved in Iron County, Garfield County, Piute County, Wayne County, Duchesne County, Weber County, and Summit County.

Democratic platform
Walter Mondale accepted the Democratic nomination for presidency after pulling narrowly ahead of Senator Gary Hart of Colorado and Rev. Jesse Jackson of Illinois - his main contenders during what would be a very contentious Democratic primary. During the primary campaign, Mondale was vocal about reduction of government spending, and, in particular, was vocal against heightened military spending on the nuclear arms race against the Soviet Union, which was reaching its peak on both sides in the early 1980s.

Taking a (what was becoming the traditional liberal) stance on the social issues of the day, Mondale advocated for gun control, the right to choose regarding abortion, and strongly opposed the repeal of laws regarding institutionalized prayer in public schools. He also criticized Reagan for what he charged was his economic marginalization of the poor, stating that Reagan's reelection campaign was "a happy talk campaign," not focused on the real issues at hand.

A very significant political move during this election: the Democratic Party nominated Representative Geraldine Ferraro to run with Mondale as Vice-President. Ferraro is the first female candidate to receive such a nomination in United States history. She said in an interview at the 1984 Democratic National Convention that this action "opened a door which will never be closed again," speaking to the role of women in politics.

Republican platform

By 1984, Reagan was very popular with voters across the nation as the President who saw them out of the economic stagflation of the early and middle 1970's, and into a period of (relative) economic stability.

The economic success seen under Reagan was politically accomplished (principally) in two ways. The first was initiation of deep tax cuts for the wealthy, and the second was a wide-spectrum of tax cuts for crude oil production and refinement, namely, with the 1980 Windfall profits tax cuts. These policies were augmented with a call for heightened military spending, the cutting of social welfare programs for the poor, and the increasing of taxes on those making less than $50,000 per year. Collectively called "Reaganomics", these economic policies were established through several pieces of legislation passed between 1980 and 1987.

Some of these new policies also arguably curbed several existing tax loopholes, preferences, and exceptions. Reaganomics has (along with legislation passed under presidents George H. W. Bush and Bill Clinton) been criticized by many analysts as "setting the stage" for economic troubles in the United States after 2007, such as the Great Recession.

Virtually unopposed during the Republican primaries, Reagan ran on a campaign of furthering his economic policies. Reagan vowed to continue his "war on drugs," passing sweeping legislation after the 1984 election in support of mandatory minimum sentences for drug possession.  Furthermore, taking a (what was becoming the traditional conservative) stance on the social issues of the day, Reagan strongly opposed legislation regarding comprehension of gay marriage, abortion, and (to a lesser extent) environmentalism, regarding the final as simply being bad for business.

Results

Results by county

See also
 United States presidential elections in Utah
 Presidency of Ronald Reagan

References

Utah
1984
1984 Utah elections